The Key to Reserva is a 2007 short film or long-form advertisement for Freixenet Cava champagne starring, written and directed by Martin Scorsese.

Plot

The film begins with  framing device, wherein Scorsese, playing himself, describing how he discovered three and a half pages of an unproduced Alfred Hitchcock film, "The Key to Reserva". As part of this film preservation work he plans to film the script as Hitchcock would have filmed it.

The film, which contains no dialogue, shows Roger Thornberry (Simon Baker) arriving at a box seat during an orchestra performance. He sees a key hidden with the box's light bulb, and goes to retrieve it. He is noticed by one of the performers, Leonard, who signals to his accomplice Louis Bernard (Michael Stuhlbarg), who is holding Roger's wife Grace hostage in the audience. Leonard then goes to stop Roger. The two fight and Leonard falls from the box seat, presumably to his death. Roger uses the key to open a locked case which contains a bottle of Freixenet with top secret files hidden inside.

The film abruptly stops, as Scorsese explains that a page is missing, so he simply filmed the concluding paragraph of the script which shows Louis Bernard arrested, as Roger and his wife reunite over a glass of Freixenet.

Scorsese then discusses with the interviewer possible future projects. The camera pans back to reveal Scorsese, Thelma Schoonmaker, and the interviewer in an office in a tower block, meanwhile crows flock around the building.

Cast

Simon Baker as Roger Thornberry
Kelli O'Hara as Grace Thornberry
Michael Stuhlbarg as Louis Bernard
Christopher Denham as Leonard
Ted Griffin as interviewer
Martin Scorsese as himself
Thelma Schoonmaker as herself

External links 

2007 films
2007 short films
2000s English-language films
English-language Spanish films
Films about film directors and producers
Short films directed by Martin Scorsese
Spanish short films
2000s Spanish films